

This list contains all of the extant historic houses located in Fairmount Park in Philadelphia, Pennsylvania. Most of the houses are referred to as mansions due to their size and use as the summer country estates of Philadelphia's affluent citizens in the 18th and 19th centuries. During that period, the city's only developed areas were located several miles away to the southeast along the Delaware River, making the current park areas along the Schuylkill River an ideal refuge from epidemics during the summer months. The mansions were built between 1742 (Belmont Mansion) and 1810 (Rockland), in various architectural styles including Colonial Revival, Federal, Georgian, Gothic Revival, Greek Revival, and Palladian, with some in combinations of those styles.

There are 19 extant historic houses of which 16 were constructed within the current boundaries of Fairmount Park, while three of the houses were moved to the park from elsewhere in the city—Cedar Grove Mansion from Frankford, Hatfield House from Nicetown, and Letitia Street House from Old City. All of the 19 houses were designed and used as private residences. The Cliffs Mansion, located in east park, has been left in ruins since a 1986 fire caused by arson. Other historic houses were demolished due to extensive deterioration, vandalism, fire damage or insufficient funds for restoration. Demolished houses are not included in this list.

Three additional historic park buildings were designed like residential houses though they were never intended to be used as private residences: the Ohio House—built by the Ohio delegation for the Centennial Exposition; the Shofuso Japanese House—built in Japan as a museum exhibit for display at MoMA, then relocated to Fairmount Park; and the Smith Memorial Playhouse—designed, and still used, as an indoor play area for children.

This list does not include the historic boathouses on Boathouse Row which were designed as sporting clubhouses rather than residential homes. The historic houses within the adjacent Wissahickon Valley Park are also not included though that park was previously within the Fairmount Park system. Since 2010, all park areas and facilities are administered separately after the merger of the Fairmount Park Commission and the Department of Recreation into the new Philadelphia Parks & Recreation department.

The Fairmount Park Conservancy's Historic Preservation Trust, in collaboration with the city of Philadelphia, offers long-term leasing of some historic houses to civic organizations and businesses. The lessees must commit to rehabilitate and maintain the buildings, without altering their historic architectural features, while allowing public access. The trust offers assistance to prospective lessees in assessing feasibility, identifying financial incentives, and managing rehabilitation and maintenance work.

Note: the general Fairmount Park National Register of Historic Places (NRHP) listing date of February 7, 1972, is entered for all sites with no individual designation record; ~ is entered for Style and Architect when unknown.

See also
 List of National Historic Landmarks in Philadelphia – includes Mount Pleasant and Woodford Mansions
 National Register of Historic Places listings in Philadelphia – includes The Cliffs, Hatfield House, Laurel Hill, Mount Pleasant and Woodford Mansions
 Philadelphia Register of Historic Places

Notes

References

External links
 
 Philadelphia Parks & Recreation – park administration
 Fairmount Park Conservancy – capital projects and historic preservation efforts; merged with the Preservation Trust in 2015
 Fairmount Park Trail Master Plan – includes a summary of mansions and houses
 Map of historic sites and buildings in Fairmount Park
 The mansions of Fairmount Park – article at philly.com

 Houses
 Fairmount Park
Fairmount Park Houses